Chanverrie is a commune in the Vendée department in the Pays de la Loire region in western France. It was established on 1 January 2019 by merger of the former communes of La Verrie (the seat) and Chambretaud.

Population

See also
Communes of the Vendée department

References

Communes of Vendée